Cocaine: An Unauthorized Biography is a 2002 non-fiction book about the history of cocaine, written by Dominic Streatfeild and published by Diane Publishing Company. The 2003 paperback edition was published by Picador. The book investigates cocaine from the chewing of the coca leaf to the large scale trafficking of cocaine into the United States.

Streatfeild goes into lucid detail about the history that the coca leaf had with the Native Americans and their Spanish overlords. He also investigates the life and impact of the world's most famous cocaine addict, Sigmund Freud. Written with sobering statistics and personal humor, Streatfeild travels to a number of locations, including to New York, indigenous areas of South America, and ultimately to Colombia to meet with the Ochoa family. Prior to his trip to Colombia, is unable to obtain life-insurance, and proceeds without it.

Within the book, the author interviews some of the most notorious figures directly involved in the distribution of Cocaine including George Jung, whose life story was depicted in the 2001 film Blow and "Freeway" Ricky Ross, the man attributed with the explosion of Cocaine use in California in the 1980s.

References

External links
My deal with old king coke, Dominic Streatfeild, Guardian/The Observer
The Candy Machine: How Cocaine Took Over the World, Tom Feiling, The Guardian
Cocaine: Hidden in Plain Sight, Melena Ryzik, New York Times

2001 non-fiction books
Books about cocaine
Non-fiction books about drug traffickers
Non-fiction books about the illegal drug trade
Picador (imprint) books